Yang Jingyuan (February 1923 – 8 June 2015) also known by her pen name Yuan Qing, was a Chinese translator.

Yang is most notable for being one of the main translators into Chinese of the works of the English novelists Charlotte Brontë and Emily Brontë.

Biography
Yang was born in a wealthy and highly educated family, in Changsha, Hunan, in February 1923, with her ancestral home in Suzhou, Jiangsu. Her mother Yuan Changying was a translator, scholar and author who graduated from University of Edinburgh and University of Paris. Her father Yang Duanliu was an economist who graduated from Hunan Normal College, Hongwen Academy, Tokyo Zhengze English College. His brother, Yang Hongyuan, was a graduate of Wuhan University.

Yang started to publish works in 1943.

After graduating from the Department of Foreign Language, Wuhan University, she attended the Department of English Language and Literature, University of Michigan, earning a  Master of Arts in 1948.

When she returned to China, she taught at the Department of Foreign Language, Wuhan University, and soon she was transferred from Wuhan to Beijing where she was appointed an editor of the People's Literature Publishing House and Chinese Academy of Social Sciences.

Yang died in Beijing, on June 8, 2015, aged 92.

Works
 The Complete Works of the Brontë Sisters
 Letters of Charlotte Brontë (Charlotte Brontë)
 The Stories of the Brontë Sisters
 The Biography of Mark
 The Biography of Engels
 The Biography of Mark and Engels
 (Joseph Conrad)
 Peter Pan (James Mathew Barrie)
 (Grahame)

Awards
 Chinese Translation Association – Competent Translator (2004)

References

1923 births
National Wuhan University alumni
University of Michigan alumni
People's Republic of China translators
English–Chinese translators
2015 deaths
Writers from Changsha
Republic of China translators
20th-century Chinese translators
21st-century Chinese translators